Rolando García Alonso  is a Mexican diplomat and  politician affiliated with the National Action Party. As of 2014 he served as Deputy of the LIX Legislature of the Mexican Congress as a plurinominal representative as replacement of Margarita Zavala. He also served as Consul General of Mexico to Shanghai from 2011 to 2014.

References

Year of birth missing (living people)
Living people
People from Mexico City
Members of the Chamber of Deputies (Mexico)
National Action Party (Mexico) politicians
Deputies of the LIX Legislature of Mexico